"Boys That Sing" is a song performed by English indie rock group Viola Beach. The song was released as a digital download on 22 January 2016 through Fuller Beans Records. It was to be the last single released by Viola Beach before their deaths in February 2016. Debuting at number 80 on the UK Singles Chart, the song later peaked at number 50 after the four band members and their manager Craig Tarry were killed in an incident on the E4 motorway bridge at Södertälje, southwest of Stockholm, Sweden on 13 February 2016. The song was included on their posthumous debut studio album. It peaked at number 50 after Coldplay covered the song as a tribute at the 2016 Glastonbury Festival. The song was written by Viola Beach and produced by Ian Grimble.

Music video
To mark the release of the group's self-titled album, a mixed-media animation video was released for the single in July 2016. The video includes a mixture of live action footage taken in Warrington the group's hometown with animated characters and footage of the group.

Track listing

Charts

Certifications

Release history

References

Viola Beach songs
2016 songs
Animated music videos